Great Britain was the co-host of the 1984 Summer Paralympics in Stoke Mandeville, United Kingdom and New York City, United States. It was represented by 227 athletes competing in archery, athletics, boccia, cycling, equestrian, football, lawn bowls, powerlifting, shooting, snooker, swimming, table tennis, volleyball, wheelchair basketball, and wheelchair fencing. It finished second in the overall medal count, with a total of 331 medals.

By hosting the Games in Stoke Mandeville, Britain was returning them to their roots. The Paralympic Games had grown out of the Stoke Mandeville Games, founded in 1948.

At the 1984 Games, Great Britain won the most medals among all Les Autres events.  They claimed 55.  Spain was second with 38 and the United States was third with 26.

Medalists

Gold medalists

Silver medalists

Bronze medalists

Medals by sport

See also 
 Great Britain at the Paralympics
 Great Britain at the 1984 Summer Olympics

External links
British Paralympic Association Website

References 

Great Britain at the Paralympics
1984 in British sport
Nations at the 1984 Summer Paralympics